The 2015 NCAA Division III baseball tournament was played at the end of the 2015 NCAA Division III baseball season to determine the 40th national champion of college baseball at the NCAA Division III level. The tournament concluded with eight teams competing at Neuroscience Group Field at Fox Cities Stadium in Grand Chute, Wisconsin for the championship. Eight regional tournaments were held to determine the participants in the World Series. Regional tournaments were contested in double-elimination format, with four regions consisting of six teams, and four consisting of eight, for a total of 56 teams participating in the tournament.

Bids
The 56 competing teams were:

By team

By conference

Regionals
Bold indicates winner.

Mideast Regional
Ross Memorial Park-Washington, PA (Host: Washington & Jefferson College)

New England Regional
Whitehouse Field-Harwich, MA (Host: Eastern College Athletic Conference)

New York Regional
Leo Pinckney Field at Falcon Park-Auburn, NY (Host: State University of New York at Cortland)

Central Regional
Riverfront Stadium-Waverly, IA (Host: Wartburg College)

West Regional
Irwin Field-Tyler, TX (Host: University of Texas at Tyler)

South Regional
Loudermilk Stadium-Demorest, GA (Host: Piedmont College)

Midwest Regional
Copeland Park-La Crosse, WI (Host: University of Wisconsin-La Crosse)

Mid-Atlantic Regional
Santander Stadium-York, PA (Host: York Revolution/Middle Atlantic Conferences)

World Series
Neuroscience Group Field at Fox Cities Stadium-Grand Chute, WI (Host: University of Wisconsin-Oshkosh/Lawrence University/Fox Cities Convention and Visitors Bureau)

References

NCAA Division III Baseball Tournament
Tournament
NCAA Division III baseball tournament